Rockelstad Castle is a neo-renaissance manor house in the municipality of Flen in Södermanland, Sweden. Rockelstad, together with Sparreholm and Vibyholm, are all estates situated on Lake Båven.

History
The old main building, dating from the 17th century, was rebuilt by Karl Sylvan in 1889 under the direction of architect Gustaf Lindgren (1863–1930). The main building, flanked by two round and two square towers, got its current appearance under Eric von Rosen (1879-1948) who owned the estate from 1900. The architect for the renovation was Ivar Tengbom (1878–1968). The large entrance hall at Rockelstad was completed in 1903. In the 1930s, the northern towers were rebuilt.

See also
List of castles in Sweden

References

External links
Rockelstad Slott website

 Buildings and structures in Södermanland County